Sophora chrysophylla, known as māmane in Hawaiian, is a species of flowering plant in the pea and bean family, Fabaceae, that is endemic to Hawaii. Yellow flowers are produced in winter and spring.

Biology

S. chrysophylla has ridged golden brown branches. The tree has pinnately compound leaves with 6 to 10 pairs of leaflets. Leaves are smooth, or with gray or yellow hairs on the underside. The specific name is derived from the Greek words χρυσός (chrysós), meaning "gold," and φυλλον (phyllos), meaning "leaf." Flowers are found at the bases of leaves or the ends of branches in clusters – that is, they occur in axillary or terminal racemes. The corolla is yellow.

The tree blooms in winter and spring. The height of the flowering season is in mid-spring. Māmane wood is dense, hard and durable. Seedpods are persistent, and remain on the tree for most of the year. Untreated, the seeds have germination rates of less than 5%. The tree is perennial and highly polymorphic.

Habitat

Māmane is an endemic species of Hawaii, and can be found on all main islands except Niihau and Kahoolawe. It inhabits low shrublands, high shrublands, dry forests, mixed mesic forests, and, rarely, wet forests. Māmane and naio (Myoporum sandwicense) define a dry woodland ecotone on the subalpine areas of East Maui (Haleakalā) and the Island of Hawaii.

Uses

Cattle ranchers used it as fence posts.

In herbal medicine, the flowers are used as an astringent. The wood was also used in religious rituals to ward off evil. A kahuna nui (high priest) would wrap a piece of māmane wood in a dark kapa cloth and hold it up to symbolize authority.

Ecology and conservation
Māmane is essential for the endangered palila (Loxioides bailleui), which feeds almost exclusively on the plants' immature seeds when these are in season. It also nests in the māmane branches. Caterpillars of Cydia moths also eat the māmanes seeds, and in turn are being eaten by the palila. Both the bird and the larvae utilize the embryo only, leaving the seed coat untouched.

To other animals, māmane seeds are highly poisonous. House finches die within minutes after eating the seeds. The māmane employs a two-layered biochemical defence system: The seed coats contain some 4% phenolic compounds, which give them a vile taste. They are also somewhat toxic and have a high fibre content. Seed predators trying to eat the seeds will probably not be killed but at least have a nasty experience. Should a predator be able to penetrate the seed coat, the embryo contains deadly quantities (>4% of dry weight) of quinolizidine alkaloids.
The palila and the moths, however, have evolved the ability to deal with the poisonous compounds. The palila, for example, can deal with dozens of times the dose of cytisine that would kill a laboratory mouse. Both seed predators seem to be able to recognize and avoid the most poisonous trees, which would be natural selection in action. Cydia caterpillars are able to break up the toxic compounds. They do not sequester the alkaloids for their own use, but are found to contain about as much phenolic compounds as the seed coats do. This seems not to be sufficient to deter predators however as they are also cryptically colored. The palila is apparently impervious to the phenolic aroma (as they eat Cydia caterpillars which would smell and taste like the plant), discarding the seed coats due to their low nutritional value. How the palila deals with the toxins is not known.(Banko et al. 2002)

Feral goats and sheep voraciously eat the seedpods of the plant, negatively impacting the tree's population. Toxicity of the leaves is unknown; it is notable that Uresiphita polygonalis virescens caterpillars which feed on the leaves have aposematic coloration. Clearly, this issue requires further study. Ranch cattle can kill trees through stomping on the roots. Wildfire has also destroyed some of the trees, though it is generally resistant to fire, and can grow quickly after one occurs. As regards diseases, the canker ascomycete Botryosphaeria mamane causes witch's broom disease, which kills heavily-infected trees (Gardner 1997). Māmane grows well in areas where there are no sheep or goats, and cattle populations are limited. The plant is being reforested in order to increase the population of both the tree itself and the palila, and revive the indigenous ecosystem.

References
 Banko, P.; Cipollini, M.L.; Breton, G.; Paulk, E.; Wink, M. & Izhaki, I. (2002): Seed chemistry of Sophora chrysophylla (Mamane) in relation to the diet of the specialist seed predator Loxioides bailleui (Palila) in Hawaii. Journal of Chemical Ecology 28(7): 1393–1410.  PDF fulltext
 Gardner, D.E. (1997): Botryosphaeria mamane sp. nov. associated with witches'-brooms on the endemic forest tree Sophora chrysophylla in Hawaii. Mycologia 89'(2): 298–303.  (HTML abstract and first page image)

Footnotes

External links

Plant Profile
General Information
Plants of Hawaii Volcanoes National Park
Hawaiian Plants – Mamane
Mamane

chrysophylla
Endemic flora of Hawaii
Trees of Hawaii
Biota of Hawaii (island)
Biota of Kauai
Biota of Lanai
Biota of Maui
Biota of Molokai
Biota of Oahu
Plants described in 1865